Hypocoela is a genus of moths in the family Geometridae described by Warren in 1897.

Species
Hypocoela abstrusa Herbulot, 1956
Hypocoela amplipennis Herbulot, 1986
Hypocoela angularis Herbulot, 1956
Hypocoela camillae Herbulot, 1996
Hypocoela drepana L. B. Prout, 1925
Hypocoela dubiefi Viette, 1979
Hypocoela fasciata Herbulot, 1956
Hypocoela herbuloti Viette, 1971
Hypocoela humidaria (Swinhoe, 1904)
Hypocoela infracta Herbulot, 1956
Hypocoela libertalia Viette, 1980
Hypocoela lurida Herbulot, 1956
Hypocoela magica Herbulot, 1956
Hypocoela mannophora L. B. Prout, 1932
Hypocoela peyrierasi Viette, 1978
Hypocoela saturnina Herbulot, 1956
Hypocoela sogai Viette, 1978
Hypocoela spodozona L. B. Prout, 1925
Hypocoela subfulva Warren, 1897
Hypocoela tornifusca Herbulot, 1970
Hypocoela turpisaria (Swinhoe, 1904)

References

Geometridae